In Greek mythology, Oaxes or Oaxos was the founder of the town of Oaxus within Crete, a place known to Servius and Herodotus. He was the son of the god Apollo either by the Cretan nymph Anchiale or Acacallis, daughter of Minos. Apollonius wrote in Argonautica of Crete being the Oaxian land. Vibius Sequester wrote the river Oaxes gave its name (to the city Oaxia). The river Oaxes was, according to Baudrand, very cold.

Notes

References 

 Publius Vergilius Maro, Eclogues. J. B. Greenough. Boston. Ginn & Co. 1895. Online version at the Perseus Digital Library.
 Publius Vergilius Maro, Bucolics, Aeneid, and Georgics of Vergil. J. B. Greenough. Boston. Ginn & Co. 1900. Latin text available at the Perseus Digital Library.
 Stephanus of Byzantium, Stephani Byzantii Ethnicorum quae supersunt, edited by August Meineike (1790-1870), published 1849. A few entries from this important ancient handbook of place names have been translated by Brady Kiesling. Online version at the Topos Text Project.

Children of Apollo
Demigods in classical mythology
Cretan characters in Greek mythology